The 2017 Dally M Awards was presented on Wednesday 27 September 2017. They are the official annual awards of the National Rugby League and are named after Dally Messenger.

Dally M Medal
Dally M Player of the Year: Cameron Smith 
 

† Taumalolo was given a 6 point penalty for being suspended for two games.

Dally M Awards
The Dally M Awards are, as usual, conducted at the close of the regular season and hence do not take games played in the finals series into account. The Dally M Medal is for the official player of the year while the Provan-Summons Medal is for the fans' of "people's choice" player of the year.

Team of the Year

Presenters
Hosts
 Yvonne Sampson, Lara Pitt, Hannah Hollis and Jessica Yates

Top Try and Point Scorer
  Jarrod CrokerRookie Award Michael EnnisPeter Frilingo Medal Phil RothfieldCaptain of the Year Mal MeningaCountdown  Johnathan ThurstonTeam of the Year'''
Mal Meninga

Judging Panel
 Greg Alexander (Fox League)
 Braith Anasta (Fox League)
 Richie Barnett (Sky Sport)
 Gary Belcher (Fox League)
 Monty Betham (Sky Sport)
 Darryl Brohman 
 Danny Buderus (Fox League)
 Brett Finch (Fox League)
 Joe Galuvao
 Mark Gasnier (Fox League)
 Ryan Girdler (Triple M)
 Daryl Halligan (Sky Sports)
 Andrew Johns (Nine)
 Dallas Johnson 
 Brett Kimmorley (Fox League)
 Darren Lockyer (Nine)
 Steve Menzies 
 Steve Roach (Fox League)
 Andrew Ryan
 Jimmy Smith
 Peter Sterling (Nine)
 Alan Tongue
 Kevin Walters (Fox League)

See also
Dally M Awards
Dally M Medal
2017 NRL season

References

Dally M Awards
Dally M Awards